Bira Circuit is a motor racing track in Thailand, located in 111 Moo 5 Banglamung, Chonburi,  northeast of Pattaya.

The venue is named after first Thai Formula 1 racing driver, Prince Birabongse Bhanudej Bhanubandh. The circuit has been operated by Bira Circuit One Company, Limited. It is a  permanent motor and motorbike racing circuit with an offroad track, a rally stage and a go-kart facility.

The circuit is twisty and bumpy and consists of elevation and two chicanes, a fast downhill double apex corner. There are 30 pits for racecars, plus a control tower, medical center and meeting room. The grandstand and spectator area can accommodate up to 100,000 people. It is also the first circuit in Thailand that meets the standard of Fédération Internationale de l'Automobile (F.I.A.). The South East Asia Touring Car Zone Challenge (SEATCZC) has been run at Bira Circuit since 1992 and the Asian Formula 2000 (AF2000) since 1997. The Circuit has full facilities for arranging all kinds of motorsport events; race meeting, racing school, test drives, etc.

On the straights of Bira's go-kart track speeds of up to  can be achieved depending on the weather conditions. In order to meet Commission Internationale de Karting's standard, the go-kart track was overhauled in 2006.

Lap records

The official fastest race lap records at the Bira Circuit are listed as:

References

External links 
 Official website
 Grunwell leads the way for Thais
 Highside Tours, Highsidetours Track Days in Thailand
 Thai Superbike, Thai Superbike Track Days in Thailand
 Track Days Website, Track Days in Thailand
 Thai trax Website, Thai Trax Track Days in Thailand
 Siam Track Days, Siam Track Days in Thailand

Motorsport venues in Thailand
Sport in Chonburi province
Buildings and structures in Pattaya
Sports venues completed in 1985
1985 establishments in Thailand